Nephilingis livida is an araneid spider from Madagascar and nearby islands. It was found to be separate from the related species Nephilingis borbonica in 2011

Etymology
The species name is derived from Latin "lividus", which can mean "malicious" as well as "bluish".

Description
The color of the female's abdomen ranges from creamy to brown, blue or purple, with a dark brown venter. Females reach a length of about 15 to 24mm Males only reach a length of 3 to 5 mm and have a yellow-brown sternum and a grey abdomen with white dots.

Distribution
N. livida occurs in Madagascar and surrounding islands, such as the Comoro Islands and Seychelles (including the Aldabra atoll). They are common in human dwellings in Madagascar.

References

 

Araneidae
Spiders of Madagascar
Spiders described in 1863